The 2004 Philadelphia Phillies season was the 122nd season in the history of the franchise.  The Phillies finished in second-place in the National League East with a record of 86–76, ten games behind the Atlanta Braves, and six games behind the NL wild-card champion Houston Astros.  The Phillies were managed by their former shortstop Larry Bowa (85–75) and Gary Varsho (1–1), who replaced Bowa on the penultimate day of the season.  The Phillies played their first season of home games at Citizens Bank Park, which opened April 12, with the visiting Cincinnati Reds defeating the Phillies, 4–1.

Offseason
November 3, 2003: Billy Wagner was traded by the Houston Astros to the Philadelphia Phillies for Brandon Duckworth, Taylor Buchholz, and Ezequiel Astacio.
January 15, 2004: A. J. Hinch signed as a free agent with the Philadelphia Phillies.

Regular season
A season of high expectations due to notable offseason moves was a disappointment, costing manager Larry Bowa his job towards season's end.

Season standings

National League East

Record vs. opponents

Notable transactions
July 30, 2004: Ricky Ledée was traded by the Philadelphia Phillies with Alfredo Simón (minors) to the San Francisco Giants for Félix Rodríguez.

Citizens Bank Park

Citizens Bank Park is a 43,647-seat baseball-only stadium in Philadelphia, Pennsylvania that opened on April 3, 2004, and hosted its first regular-season baseball game on April 12 of that same year, as the tenants of the facility, the Philadelphia Phillies lost to the Cincinnati Reds, 4–1.  The ballpark was built to replace the now-demolished Veterans Stadium (a football/baseball multipurpose facility), and features natural grass and dirt playing field and also features a number of Philadelphia style food stands, including several which serve cheesesteaks, hoagies, and other regional specialties. Behind center field is Ashburn Alley, named after Phillies great center fielder and Hall of Famer Richie Ashburn, a walkway featuring restaurants and memorabilia from Phillies history, along with a restaurant/bar and grille called "Harry The K's" named after Hall of Fame broadcaster Harry Kalas.  

Randy Wolf of the Phillies threw the first pitch at 1:32 PM US EDT on April 12, 2004, to D'Angelo Jiménez of the Reds, who got the park's first hit, a leadoff double.  Bobby Abreu of the Phillies hit the first home run, which also served as the franchise's first hit in the club's new home. Reds pitcher Paul Wilson earned the first win in that game and Danny Graves earned the park's first save.
On June 14, 2004, Jim Thome  hit his 400th career home run to the left-center field seats at Citizens Bank Park.

2004 game log

|- style="background:#fbb"
| 1 || April 5 || @ Pirates || 1–2 || Kip Wells (1–0) || Kevin Millwood (0–1) || José Mesa (1) || 35,702 || 0–1
|- style="background:#bfb"
| 2 || April 7 || @ Pirates || 5–4 || Rhéal Cormier (1–0) || Brian Boehringer (0–1) || Billy Wagner (1) || 15,126 || 1–1
|- style="background:#fbb"
| 3 || April 8 || @ Pirates || 2–6 || Ryan Vogelsong (1–0) || Vicente Padilla (0–1) || José Mesa (2) || 9,689 || 1–2
|- style="background:#fbb"
| 4 || April 9 || @ Marlins || 3–4 || Matt Perisho (2–0) || Rhéal Cormier (1–1) || Armando Benítez (3) || 22,923 || 1–3
|- style="background:#fbb"
| 5 || April 10 || @ Marlins || 3–5 || Darren Oliver (1–0) || Rhéal Cormier (1–2) || Armando Benítez (4) || 45,725 || 1–4
|- style="background:#fbb"
| 6 || April 11 || @ Marlins || 1–3 || Josh Beckett (1–0) || Kevin Millwood (0–2) || Armando Benítez (5) || 21,317 || 1–5
|- style="background:#fbb"
| 7 || April 12 || Reds || 1–4 || Paul Wilson (2–0) || Randy Wolf (0–1) || Danny Graves (4) || 41,626 || 1–6
|- style="background:#bbb"
| – || April 14 || Reds || colspan=6 | Postponed (rain); Makeup: June 14
|- style="background:#bfb"
| 8 || April 15 || Reds || 6–4 || Rhéal Cormier (2–2) || Ryan Wagner (0–1) || Billy Wagner (2) || 37,512 || 2–6
|- style="background:#bfb"
| 9 || April 16 || Expos || 4–2 || Eric Milton (1–0) || Liván Hernández (0–2) || Billy Wagner (3) || 39,613 || 3–6
|- style="background:#bfb"
| 10 || April 17 || Expos || 6–3 || Kevin Millwood (1–2) || John Patterson (1–1) || Billy Wagner (4) || 42,931 || 4–6
|- style="background:#bfb"
| 11 || April 18 || Expos || 5–4 || Billy Wagner (1–0) || Rocky Biddle (0–1) || None || 43,791 || 5–6
|- style="background:#fbb"
| 12 || April 20 || Marlins || 1–3 || Dontrelle Willis (3–0) || Vicente Padilla (0–2) || Armando Benítez (7) || 36,479 || 5–7
|- style="background:#fbb"
| 13 || April 21 || Marlins || 7–8 (12) || Justin Wayne (1–0) || Ryan Madson (0–1) || None || 34,060 || 5–8
|- style="background:#fbb"
| 14 || April 22 || Marlins || 7–9 || Darren Oliver (2–1) || Brett Myers (0–1) || Armando Benítez (8) || 35,880 || 5–9
|- style="background:#bfb"
| 15 || April 23 || @ Expos || 8–6 || Kevin Millwood (2–2) || Chad Bentz (0–2) || Billy Wagner (5) || 30,112 || 6–9
|- style="background:#bfb"
| 16 || April 24 || @ Expos || 7–0 || Randy Wolf (1–1) || Tomo Ohka (0–4) || None || 6,899 || 7–9
|- style="background:#fbb"
| 17 || April 25 || @ Expos || 0–2 || Zach Day (2–1) || Vicente Padilla (0–3) || Rocky Biddle (5) || 8,267 || 7–10
|- style="background:#bfb"
| 18 || April 27 || @ Cardinals || 7–3 || Eric Milton (2–0) || Matt Morris (3–2) || None || 25,185 || 8–10
|- style="background:#bfb"
| 19 || April 28 || @ Cardinals || 6–3 || Ryan Madson (1–1) || Mike Lincoln (2–2) || Billy Wagner (6) || 26,348 || 9–10
|- style="background:#fbb"
| 20 || April 29 || @ Cardinals || 4–5 (13) || Mike Lincoln (3–2) || Amaury Telemaco (0–1) || None || 29,768 || 9–11
|- style="background:#bfb"
| 21 || April 30 || Diamondbacks || 4–0 || Randy Wolf (2–1) || Elmer Dessens (1–3) || None || 43,721 || 10–11
|-

|- style="background:#fbb"
| 22 || May 1 || Diamondbacks || 4–6 || Randy Johnson (3–2) || Vicente Padilla (0–4) || Matt Mantei (4) || 44,048 || 10–12
|- style="background:#bfb"
| 23 || May 2 || Diamondbacks || 6–5 (14) || Ryan Madson (2–1) || Óscar Villarreal (0–2) || None || 43,025 || 11–12
|- style="background:#fbb"
| 24 || May 4 || Cardinals || 5–6 || Chris Carpenter (2–1) || Brett Myers (0–2) || Jason Isringhausen (3) || 33,294 || 11–13
|- style="background:#bfb"
| 25 || May 5 || Cardinals || 5–4 || Kevin Millwood (3–2) || Woody Williams (0–3) || Billy Wagner (7) || 35,944 || 12–13
|- style="background:#fbb"
| 26 || May 6 || Cardinals || 4–7 || Jeff Suppan (3–3) || Randy Wolf (2–2) || Jason Isringhausen (4) || 44,376 || 12–14
|- style="background:#bfb"
| 27 || May 7 || @ Diamondbacks || 4–1 || Vicente Padilla (1–4) || Randy Johnson (3–3) || Billy Wagner (8) || 30,738 || 13–14
|- style="background:#bfb"
| 28 || May 8 || @ Diamondbacks || 8–7 || Eric Milton (3–0) || Brandon Webb (2–2) || Tim Worrell (1) || 38,907 || 14–14
|- style="background:#bfb"
| 29 || May 9 || @ Diamondbacks || 7–1 || Brett Myers (1–2) || Steve Sparks (2–2) || None || 29,637 || 15–14
|- style="background:#bfb"
| 30 || May 11 || @ Giants || 10–4 || Kevin Millwood (4–2) || Jerome Williams (3–2) || None || 35,759 || 16–14
|- style="background:#fbb"
| 31 || May 12 || @ Giants || 3–4 || Jason Schmidt (3–2) || Randy Wolf (2–3) || Matt Herges (11) || 35,849 || 16–15
|- style="background:#bfb"
| 32 || May 13 || @ Giants || 4–3 || Vicente Padilla (2–4) || Kirk Rueter (1–4) || Ryan Madson (1) || 39,651 || 17–15
|- style="background:#bfb"
| 33 || May 14 || @ Rockies || 6–4 || Eric Milton (4–0) || Joe Kennedy (4–1) || Tim Worrell (2) || 32,171 || 18–15
|- style="background:#bfb"
| 34 || May 15 || @ Rockies || 16–5 || Brett Myers (2–2) || Scott Elarton (0–6) || None || 33,629 || 19–15
|- style="background:#fbb"
| 35 || May 16 || @ Rockies || 6–7 || Tim Harikkala (1–0) || Rhéal Cormier (2–3) || Shawn Chacón (10) || 33,623 || 19–16
|- style="background:#fbb"
| 36 || May 17 || @ Rockies || 6–7 || Brian Fuentes (1–0) || Tim Worrell (0–1) || None || 22,111 || 19–17
|- style="background:#bfb"
| 37 || May 18 || Dodgers || 8–7 || Vicente Padilla (3–4) || Guillermo Mota (2–1) || Tim Worrell (3) || 36,073 || 20–17
|- style="background:#bfb"
| 38 || May 19 || Dodgers || 9–4 || Eric Milton (5–0) || Hideo Nomo (3–5) || None || 33,916 || 21–17
|- style="background:#bfb"
| 39 || May 20 || Dodgers || 4–0 || Brett Myers (3–2) || Kazuhisa Ishii (5–3) || None || 37,793 || 22–17
|- style="background:#bfb"
| 40 || May 21 || Padres || 5–4 || Ryan Madson (3–1) || Akinori Otsuka (3–2) || Tim Worrell (4) || 40,555 || 23–17
|- style="background:#fbb"
| 41 || May 22 || Padres || 6–9 || Justin Germano (1–0) || Roberto Hernández (0–1) || None || 43,634 || 23–18
|- style="background:#bfb"
| 42 || May 23 || Padres || 6–4 || Vicente Padilla (4–4) || Brian Lawrence (6–3) || Tim Worrell (5) || 44,216 || 24–18
|- style="background:#fbb"
| 43 || May 25 || @ Mets || 0–5 || Steve Trachsel (5–3) || Eric Milton (5–1) || None || 29,385 || 24–19
|- style="background:#bfb"
| 44 || May 26 || @ Mets || 7–4 || Roberto Hernández (1–1) || John Franco (0–3) || Tim Worrell (6) || 20,349 || 25–19
|- style="background:#fbb"
| 45 || May 27 || Braves || 1–6 || Jaret Wright (3–5) || Kevin Millwood (4–3) || None || 38,802 || 25–20
|- style="background:#bfb"
| 46 || May 28 || Braves || 3–2 (10) || Tim Worrell (1–1) || Antonio Alfonseca (5–1) || None || 40,187 || 26–20
|- style="background:#fbb"
| 47 || May 29 || Braves || 3–9 || John Thomson (4–2) || Vicente Padilla (4–5) || None || 44,057 || 26–21
|- style="background:#bfb"
| 48 || May 30 || Braves || 4–1 || Eric Milton (6–1) || Travis Smith (0–1) || Tim Worrell (7) || 44,304 || 27–21
|- style="background:#fbb"
| 49 || May 31 || Mets || 3–5 || Orber Moreno (1–1) || Brett Myers (3–3) || Braden Looper (8) || 43,620 || 27–22
|-

|- style="background:#fbb"
| 50 || June 1 || Mets || 1–4 (10) || Ricky Bottalico (2–0) || Tim Worrell (1–2) || Braden Looper (9) || 34,436 || 27–23
|- style="background:#fbb"
| 51 || June 2 || Mets || 5–3 (10) || David Weathers (5–1) || Roberto Hernández (1–2) || Braden Looper (10) || 37,625 || 27–24
|- style="background:#fbb"
| 52 || June 3 || @ Braves || 4–8 || John Thomson (5–2) || Josh Hancock (0–1) || None || 23,405 || 27–25
|- style="background:#bfb"
| 53 || June 4 || @ Braves || 9–1 || Eric Milton (7–1) || Travis Smith (0–2) || None || 27,699 || 28–25
|- style="background:#bfb"
| 54 || June 5 || @ Braves || 5–3 || Brett Myers (4–3) || Russ Ortiz (6–5) || Tim Worrell (8) || 29,252 || 29–25
|- style="background:#fbb"
| 55 || June 6 || @ Braves || 4–6 || Jaret Wright (4–5) || Kevin Millwood (4–4) || John Smoltz (8) || 27,775 || 29–26
|- style="background:#fbb"
| 56 || June 8 || @ White Sox || 11–14 || Mark Buehrle (6–1) || Amaury Telemaco (0–2) || Cliff Politte (1) || 33,114 || 29–27
|- style="background:#bfb"
| 57 || June 9 || @ White Sox || 13–10 || Eric Milton (8–1) || Jon Garland (5–3) || None || 17,570 || 30–27
|- style="background:#bbb"
| – || June 10 || @ White Sox || colspan=6 | Postponed (rain); Makeup: August 30
|- style="background:#bfb"
| 58 || June 11 || @ Twins || 11–6 || Tim Worrell (2–2) || Terry Mulholland (0–2) || None || 22,272 || 31–27
|- style="background:#fbb"
| 59 || June 12 || @ Twins || 1–6 || Carlos Silva (7–3) || Kevin Millwood (4–5) || None || 22,219 || 31–28
|- style="background:#bfb"
| 60 || June 13 || @ Twins || 2–1 || Rhéal Cormier (3–3) || Aaron Fultz (2–2) || Billy Wagner (9) || 23,479 || 32–28
|- style="background:#bfb"
| 61 || June 14 || Reds || 10–7 (8) || Ryan Madson (4–1) || John Riedling (4–1) || None || 44,710 || 33–28
|- style="background:#fbb"
| 62 || June 15 || Tigers || 3–10 || Jeremy Bonderman (5–5) || Brian Powell (0–1) || None || 39,555 || 33–29
|- style="background:#bbb"
| – || June 16 || Tigers || colspan=6 | Postponed (rain); Makeup: June 17 as a day-night double-header
|- style="background:#bfb"
| 63 || June 17 (1) || Tigers || 6–2 || Brett Myers (5–3) || Mike Maroth (5–4) || None || 44,551 || 34–29
|- style="background:#fbb"
| 64 || June 17 (2) || Tigers || 4–5 (11) || Ugueth Urbina (2–2) || Ryan Madson (4–2) || Danny Patterson (2) || 39,674 || 34–30
|- style="background:#fbb"
| 65 || June 18 || Royals || 4–10 || Chris George (1–0) || Paul Abbott (2–6) || None || 43,571 || 34–31
|- style="background:#bfb"
| 66 || June 19 || Royals || 4–2 || Eric Milton (9–1) || Zack Greinke (1–3) || Billy Wagner (10) || 44,234 || 35–31
|- style="background:#bfb"
| 67 || June 20 || Royals || 8–2 || Brian Powell (1–1) || Dennys Reyes (2–2) || None || 44,411 || 36–31
|- style="background:#fbb"
| 68 || June 22 || @ Expos || 2–5 || Liván Hernández (4–7) || Brett Myers (5–4) || Chad Cordero (3) || 4,564 || 36–32
|- style="background:#bfb"
| 69 || June 23 || @ Expos || 5–2 || Kevin Millwood (5–5) || Sun-Woo Kim (3–3) || Billy Wagner (11) || 4,209 || 37–32
|- style="background:#fbb"
| 70 || June 24 || @ Expos || 2–3 || Tony Armas (1–2) || Eric Milton (9–2) || Chad Cordero (4) || 11,655 || 37–33
|- style="background:#fbb"
| 71 || June 25 || @ Red Sox || 1–12 (8) || Pedro Martínez (8–3) || Paul Abbott (2–7) || None || 35,059 || 37–34
|- style="background:#bfb"
| 72 || June 26 || @ Red Sox || 9–2 || Ryan Madson (5–2) || Bronson Arroyo (2–7) || None || 34,712 || 38–34
|- style="background:#fbb"
| 73 || June 27 || @ Red Sox || 3–12 || Curt Schilling (10–4) || Brett Myers (5–5) || None || 34,739 || 38–35
|- style="background:#bfb"
| 74 || June 28 || Expos || 14–6 || Kevin Millwood (6–5) || Sun-Woo Kim (3–4) || None || 39,444 || 39–35
|- style="background:#bfb"
| 75 || June 29 || Expos || 17–7 || Eric Milton (10–2) || Shawn Hill (0–1) || None || 35,390 || 40–35
|- style="background:#fbb"
| 76 || June 30 || Expos || 3–6 || Joe Horgan (1–0) || Tim Worrell (2–3) || Chad Cordero (5) || 40,407 || 40–36
|-

|- style="background:#bfb"
| 77 || July 1 || Expos || 10–5 || Randy Wolf (3–3) || Scott Downs (0–2) || None || 43,246 || 41–36
|- style="background:#fbb"
| 78 || July 2 || Orioles || 6–7 (16) || Eddy Rodríguez (1–0) || Brian Powell (1–2) || Daniel Cabrera (1) || 44,390 || 41–37
|- style="background:#bfb"
| 79 || July 3 || Orioles || 7–6 || Rhéal Cormier (4–3) || Jason Grimsley (3–5) || Billy Wagner (12) || 44,163 || 42–37
|- style="background:#bfb"
| 80 || July 4 || Orioles || 5–2 || Eric Milton (11–2) || Sidney Ponson (3–12) || Tim Worrell (9) || 43,396 || 43–37
|- style="background:#bfb"
| 81 || July 5 || Mets || 6–5 || Ryan Madson (6–2) || Tom Glavine (7–6) || Billy Wagner (13) || 41,571 || 44–37
|- style="background:#fbb"
| 82 || July 6 || Mets || 1–4 || Al Leiter (5–2) || Randy Wolf (3–4) || Braden Looper (17) || 36,230 || 44–38
|- style="background:#fbb"
| 83 || July 7 || Mets || 1–10 || Steve Trachsel (9–6) || Brett Myers (5–6) || None || 37,687 || 44–39
|- style="background:#bfb"
| 84 || July 8 || Mets || 5–4 || Billy Wagner (2–0) || John Franco (2–5) || None || 42,601 || 45–39
|- style="background:#bfb"
| 85 || July 9 || Braves || 7–6 (10) || Billy Wagner (3–0) || Antonio Alfonseca (5–3) || None || 44,180 || 46–39
|- style="background:#fbb"
| 86 || July 10 || Braves || 0–4 || Mike Hampton (4–8) || Paul Abbott (2–8) || None || 44,307 || 46–40
|- style="background:#fbb"
| 87 || July 11 || Braves || 4–6 || Russ Ortiz (10–6) || Randy Wolf (3–5) || John Smoltz (16) || 44,519 || 46–41
|- style="background:#bbcaff;"
| – || July 13 ||colspan="7" |2004 Major League Baseball All-Star Game at Minute Maid Park in Houston
|- style="background:#fbb"
| 88 || July 15 || @ Mets || 2–3 (11) || José Parra (1–0) || Roberto Hernández (1–3) || None || 36,803 || 46–42
|- style="background:#bfb"
| 89 || July 16 || @ Mets || 5–1 || Kevin Millwood (7–5) || Jae Weong Seo (4–6) || Billy Wagner (14) || 42,584 || 47–42
|- style="background:#bfb"
| 90 || July 17 || @ Mets || 8–2 || Randy Wolf (4–5) || Tom Glavine (7–8) || None || 35,425 || 48–42
|- style="background:#fbb"
| 91 || July 18 || @ Mets || 1–6 || Al Leiter (6–3) || Brett Myers (5–7) || Braden Looper (19) || 30,443 || 48–43
|- style="background:#fbb"
| 92 || July 19 || @ Braves || 2–4 || Mike Hampton (5–8) || Paul Abbott (2–9) || John Smoltz (18) || 25,790 || 48–44
|- style="background:#bfb"
| 93 || July 20 || @ Braves || 4–3 (10) || Tim Worrell (3–3) || Antonio Alfonseca (5–4) || Billy Wagner (15) || 36,006 || 49–44
|- style="background:#bfb"
| 94 || July 21 || Marlins || 2–1 || Kevin Millwood (8–5) || A. J. Burnett (1–5) || Billy Wagner (16) || 44,077 || 50–44
|- style="background:#fbb"
| 95 || July 22 || Marlins || 8–10 || Carl Pavano (10–4) || Randy Wolf (4–6) || Armando Benítez (33) || 44,316 || 50–45
|- style="background:#fbb"
| 96 || July 23 || Cubs || 1–5 || Kerry Wood (5–3) || Brett Myers (5–8) || None || 44,060 || 50–46
|- style="background:#bfb"
| 97 || July 24 || Cubs || 4–3 || Paul Abbott (3–9) || Carlos Zambrano (9–6) || Tim Worrell (10) || 44,493 || 51–46
|- style="background:#bfb"
| 98 || July 25 || Cubs || 3–2 || Ryan Madson (7–2) || LaTroy Hawkins (2–3) || None || 44,539 || 52–46
|- style="background:#fbb"
| 99 || July 26 || @ Marlins || 3–11 || A. J. Burnett (2–5) || Kevin Millwood (8–6) || Nate Bump (1) || 13,507 || 52–47
|- style="background:#fbb"
| 100 || July 27 || @ Marlins || 2–5 || Carl Pavano (11–4) || Rhéal Cormier (4–4) || Josías Manzanillo (1) || 15,523 || 52–48
|- style="background:#fbb"
| 101 || July 28 || @ Marlins || 3–6 || Josías Manzanillo (3–2) || Tim Worrell (3–4) || None || 17,404 || 52–49
|- style="background:#fbb"
| 102 || July 29 || @ Marlins || 1–10 || Dontrelle Willis (8–6) || Paul Abbott (3–10) || None || 20,391 || 52–50
|- style="background:#fbb"
| 103 || July 30 || @ Cubs || 7–10 || Jon Leicester (3–0) || Rhéal Cormier (4–5) || LaTroy Hawkins (15) || 39,117 || 52–51
|- style="background:#bfb"
| 104 || July 31 || @ Cubs || 4–3 || Kevin Millwood (9–6) || Matt Clement (8–10) || Tim Worrell (11) || 39,086 || 53–51
|-

|- style="background:#fbb"
| 105 || August 1 || @ Cubs || 3–6 || Kent Mercker (2–0) || Randy Wolf (4–7) || LaTroy Hawkins (16) || 39,032 || 53–52
|- style="background:#bfb"
| 106 || August 3 || @ Padres || 5–2 || Brett Myers (6–8) || Brian Lawrence (11–8) || None || 37,134 || 54–52
|- style="background:#bfb"
| 107 || August 4 || @ Padres || 7–5 || Eric Milton (12–2) || Adam Eaton (6–10) || Tim Worrell (12) || 30,085 || 55–52
|- style="background:#bfb"
| 108 || August 5 || @ Padres || 5–3 (10) || Félix Rodríguez (4–5) || Trevor Hoffman (2–2) || Tim Worrell (13) || 36,127 || 56–52
|- style="background:#bfb"
| 109 || August 6 || @ Dodgers || 9–5 (11) || Roberto Hernández (2–3) || Éric Gagné (4–1) || None || 53,977 || 57–52
|- style="background:#fbb"
| 110 || August 7 || @ Dodgers || 3–6 || Odalis Pérez (5–4) || Paul Abbott (3–11) || Éric Gagné (33) || 54,404 || 57–53
|- style="background:#bfb"
| 111 || August 8 || @ Dodgers || 4–1 || Brett Myers (7–8) || Brad Penny (9–9) || None || 53,840 || 58–53
|- style="background:#fbb"
| 112 || August 9 || Rockies || 2–4 || Tim Harikkala (5–2) || Todd Jones (8–3) || Shawn Chacón (27) || 42,031 || 58–54
|- style="background:#fbb"
| 113 || August 10 || Rockies || 4–5 || Steve Reed (3–2) || Tim Worrell (3–5) || Shawn Chacón (28) || 36,636 || 58–55
|- style="background:#bfb"
| 114 || August 11 || Rockies || 15–4 || Randy Wolf (5–7) || Jason Jennings (10–10) || None || 40,634 || 59–55
|- style="background:#fbb"
| 115 || August 12 || Rockies || 1–3 || Shawn Estes (13–4) || Cory Lidle (7–11) || Shawn Chacón (29) || 37,464 || 59–56
|- style="background:#fbb"
| 116 || August 13 || Giants || 6–16 || Brad Hennessey (1–1) || Brett Myers (7–9) || None || 43,036 || 59–57
|- style="background:#fbb"
| 117 || August 14 || Giants || 6–7 || Jason Christiansen (2–2) || Félix Rodríguez (4–6) || Dustin Hermanson (2) || 43,712 || 59–58
|- style="background:#fbb"
| 118 || August 15 || Giants || 1–3 || Brett Tomko (6–6) || Vicente Padilla (4–6) || Dustin Hermanson (3) || 43,610 || 59–59
|- style="background:#fbb"
| 119 || August 17 || Astros || 0–5 || Roy Oswalt (13–8) || Randy Wolf (5–8) || None || 43,716 || 59–60
|- style="background:#fbb"
| 120 || August 18 || Astros || 8–9 || Chad Harville (1–2) || Todd Jones (8–4) || Brad Lidge (14) || 43,895 || 59–61
|- style="background:#fbb"
| 121 || August 19 || Astros || 10–12 || Chad Qualls (1–0) || Roberto Hernández (2–4) || Brad Lidge (15) || 43,543 || 59–62
|- style="background:#bfb"
| 122 || August 20 || @ Brewers || 4–2 || Eric Milton (13–2) || Doug Davis (10–10) || Tim Worrell (14) || 22,559 || 60–62
|- style="background:#bfb"
| 123 || August 21 || @ Brewers || 8–6 || Geoff Geary (1–0) || Luis Vizcaíno (4–3) || Tim Worrell (15) || 30,841 || 61–62
|- style="background:#bfb"
| 124 || August 22 || @ Brewers || 9–6 (10) || Félix Rodríguez (5–6) || Dan Kolb (0–3) || Tim Worrell (16) || 32,411 || 62–62
|- style="background:#fbb"
| 125 || August 23 || @ Astros || 4–8 || Roger Clemens (13–4) || Cory Lidle (7–12) || None || 36,398 || 62–63
|- style="background:#fbb"
| 126 || August 24 || @ Astros || 2–4 || Roy Oswalt (14–9) || Todd Jones (8–5) || Brad Lidge (16) || 37,127 || 62–64
|- style="background:#fbb"
| 127 || August 25 || @ Astros || 4–7 || Chad Qualls (2–0) || Félix Rodríguez (5–7) || Brad Lidge (17) || 37,217 || 62–65
|- style="background:#bfb"
| 128 || August 27 || Brewers || 6–1 || Vicente Padilla (5–6) || Víctor Santos (10–9) || None || 40,367 || 63–65
|- style="background:#bfb"
| 129 || August 28 || Brewers || 4–3 || Tim Worrell (4–5) || Mike Adams (2–2) || None || 43,267 || 64–65
|- style="background:#bfb"
| 130 || August 29 || Brewers || 10–0 || Cory Lidle (8–12) || Wes Obermueller (4–7) || None || 43,339 || 65–65
|- style="background:#fbb"
| 131 || August 30 || @ White Sox || 8–9 || Mark Buehrle (12–8) || Roberto Hernández (2–5) || Shingo Takatsu (14) || 5,747 || 65–66
|- style="background:#fbb"
| 132 || August 31 || Braves || 3–5 || Mike Hampton (11–9) || Eric Milton (13–3) || None || 36,028 || 65–67
|-

|- style="background:#fbb"
| 133 || September 1 || Braves || 2–7 || Jaret Wright (14–6) || Vicente Padilla (5–7) || None || 35,031 || 65–68
|- style="background:#bfb"
| 134 || September 3 || Mets || 8–1 || Gavin Floyd (1–0) || Heath Bell (0–2) || None || 37,267 || 66–68
|- style="background:#bfb"
| 135 || September 4 || Mets || 7–0 || Cory Lidle (9–12) || Al Leiter (9–6) || None || 43,089 || 67–68
|- style="background:#bfb"
| 136 || September 5 || Mets || 4–2 || Brett Myers (8–9) || Steve Trachsel (10–13) || Tim Worrell (17) || 43,628 || 68–68
|- style="background:#fbb"
| 137 || September 6 || @ Braves || 1–3 || Travis Smith (1–3) || Eric Milton (13–4) || John Smoltz (36) || 31,949 || 68–69
|- style="background:#bbb"
| – || September 7 || @ Braves || colspan=6 | Postponed (rain); Makeup: September 8 as a traditional double-header
|- style="background:#bfb"
| 138 || September 8 (1) || @ Braves || 5–3 || Ryan Madson (8–2) || Chris Reitsma (6–4) || Billy Wagner (17) || see 2nd game || 69–69
|- style="background:#bfb"
| 139 || September 8 (2) || @ Braves || 4–1 || Todd Jones (9–5) || Paul Byrd (6–5) || Tim Worrell (18) || 20,320 || 70–69
|- style="background:#bfb"
| 140 || September 9 || @ Braves || 9–4 || Ryan Madson (9–2) || Román Colón (1–1) || None || 20,285 || 71–69
|- style="background:#bfb"
| 141 || September 10 || @ Mets || 9–5 || Todd Jones (10–5) || Ricky Bottalico (3–2) || None || 27,827 || 72–69
|- style="background:#bfb"
| 142 || September 11 || @ Mets || 11–9 (13) || Roberto Hernández (3–5) || Vic Darensbourg (0–1) || Félix Rodríguez (1) || 21,718 || 73–69
|- style="background:#bfb"
| 143 || September 12 || @ Mets || 4–2 || Vicente Padilla (6–7) || Tom Glavine (9–13) || Tim Worrell (19) || 23,391 || 74–69
|- style="background:#fbb"
| 144 || September 13 || @ Reds || 3–4 || Joe Valentine (2–3) || Félix Rodríguez (5–8) || Danny Graves (39) || 15,930 || 74–70
|- style="background:#fbb"
| 145 || September 14 || @ Reds || 6–7 || Ryan Wagner (3–1) || Ryan Madson (9–3) || Danny Graves (40) || 15,364 || 74–71
|- style="background:#bfb"
| 146 || September 15 || @ Reds || 9–1 || Brett Myers (9–9) || Brandon Claussen (2–5) || None || 16,292 || 75–71
|- style="background:#fbb"
| 147 || September 17 || Expos || 8–12 || Luis Ayala (6–11) || Tim Worrell (4–6) || None || 35,498 || 75–72
|- style="background:#fbb"
| 148 || September 18 || Expos || 5–6 (14) || Chad Cordero (6–4) || Brett Myers (9–10) || Francis Beltrán (1) || 38,650 || 75–73
|- style="background:#bfb"
| 149 || September 19 || Expos || 7–2 || Gavin Floyd (2–0) || Scott Downs (3–6) || None || 42,603 || 76–73
|- style="background:#bfb"
| 150 || September 21 || @ Marlins || 4–2 || Cory Lidle (10–12) || Dontrelle Willis (10–10) || Billy Wagner (18) || 15,659 || 77–73
|- style="background:#bfb"
| 151 || September 22 || @ Marlins || 12–4 || Eric Milton (14–4) || Logan Kensing (0–3) || None || 20,416 || 78–73
|- style="background:#bfb"
| 152 || September 23 || @ Marlins || 9–8 (10) || Billy Wagner (4–0) || Armando Benítez (2–2) || Todd Jones (2) || 30,208 || 79–73
|- style="background:#fbb"
| 153 || September 24 || @ Expos || 1–8 || Sun-Woo Kim (4–5) || Brett Myers (9–11) || None || 5,481 || 79–74
|- style="background:#bfb"
| 154 || September 25 || @ Expos || 4–3 (10) || Tim Worrell (5–6) || Joey Eischen (0–1) || Billy Wagner (19) || 8,491 || 80–74
|- style="background:#bfb"
| 155 || September 26 || @ Expos || 2–1 || Cory Lidle (11–12) || Liván Hernández (11–15) || Billy Wagner (20) || 12,382 || 81–74
|- style="background:#fbb"
| 156 || September 27 || Pirates || 1–6 || Óliver Pérez (11–10) || Eric Milton (14–5) || None || 30,268 || 81–75
|- style="background:#bbb"
| – || September 28 || Pirates || colspan=6 | Postponed (rain); Makeup: September 29 as a traditional double-header
|- style="background:#bfb"
| 157 || September 29 (1) || Pirates || 8–4 || Vicente Padilla (7–7) || Ian Snell (0–1) || None || see 2nd game || 82–75
|- style="background:#bfb"
| 158 || September 29 (2) || Pirates || 8–3 || Brett Myers (10–11) || Salomón Torres (7–7) || None || 33,127 || 83–75
|- style="background:#bfb"
| 159 || September 30 || Marlins || 7–4 || Todd Jones (11–5) || Guillermo Mota (9–8) || Billy Wagner (21) || 36,080 || 84–75
|-

|- style="background:#bfb"
| 160 || October 1 || Marlins || 6–2 || Cory Lidle (12–12) || Matt Perisho (5–3) || None || 34,494 || 85–75
|- style="background:#fbb"
| 161 || October 2 || Marlins || 3–4 || Josh Beckett (9–9) || Eric Milton (14–6) || Armando Benítez (47) || 36,279 || 85–76
|- style="background:#bfb"
| 162 || October 3 || Marlins || 10–4 || Brett Myers' (11–11) || Ismael Valdez (14–9) || None || 43,560 || 86–76
|-

Roster

Player stats

Batting

Starters by positionNote: Pos = Position; G = Games played; AB = At bats; H = Hits; Avg. = Batting average; HR = Home runs; RBI = Runs batted inOther battersNote: G = Games played; AB = At bats; H = Hits; Avg. = Batting average; HR = Home runs; RBI = Runs batted inPitching

Starting pitchersNote: G = Games pitched; IP = Innings pitched; W = Wins; L = Losses; ERA = Earned run average; SO = StrikeoutsOther pitchersNote: G = Games pitched; IP = Innings pitched; W = Wins; L = Losses; ERA = Earned run average; SO = StrikeoutsRelief pitchersNote: G = Games pitched; W = Wins; L = Losses; SV = Saves; ERA = Earned run average; SO = Strikeouts''

Farm system

References

External links
Baseball Almanac: 2004 Philadelphia Phillies season
Baseball Reference: 2004 Philadelphia Phillies season

Philadelphia Phillies seasons
Philadelphia Phillies Season, 2004
Philadelphia Phillies